Jean-Baptiste Dotto (27 March 1928, in St-Nazaire – 20 February 2000, in Ollioules, France) was the first French racing cyclist to win the Vuelta a España. He rode the Tour de France 13 times, coming fourth in 1954.

Jean Dotto was born with Italian nationality. He became French in 1937. Dotto was a good climber. He became an independent, or semi-professional, in 1948 and won a race up Mont Ventoux that year and won Marseille-Toulon-Marseille and the climb of La Turbie, near Nice in 1950. He turned professional in 1951 for France-Sport-Dunlop and won five races, including three hill climbs, in his first season. He rode until 1963, winning 35 races, including the Dauphiné-Libéré twice. He won stage 19 of the 1954 Tour de France and next year won the Vuelta by beating Julio Jiménez of Spain and Raphaël Géminiani of France.

Of his era, he said: "We took amphetamine but not all the year. That allowed us to win and it wasn't very dangerous."

Major results

1952
 1st, Overall, Critérium du Dauphiné Libéré
 8th, Overall, Tour de France
1954
 4th, Overall, Tour de France
 1st, Stage 19, Briançon > Aix-les-Bains (221 km)
1955
 1st, Overall, Vuelta a España
1956 – Sud-Est
 19th, Overall, Tour de France
1957
 10th, Overall, Tour de France
1958 – Centre-Midi
 DNF Stage 23, Tour de France
 3rd, Climbers Classification
1959
 15th, Overall, Tour de France
1960
 1st, Overall, Critérium du Dauphiné Libéré
 35th, Overall, Tour de France
1961
 8th, Overall, Tour de France
1962
 58th, Overall, Tour de France
1963
 28th, Overall, Tour de France

References

External links 

Official Tour de France results for Jean Dotto

1928 births
2000 deaths
French male cyclists
French Tour de France stage winners
French Giro d'Italia stage winners
Vuelta a España winners
Sportspeople from Saint-Nazaire
Cyclists from Loire-Atlantique